In the 1835 election for the Head of State of Costa Rica, Braulio Carrillo Colina won using the model of indirect suffrage. At that time the Constitution established a system in which male Costa Ricans voted publicly to elect their electoral delegates who, in proportion to the population of the area they represented, then elected the Head of State. San Jose chose 11, Cartago 8, Heredia 8, Alajuela 5, Bagaces 1, Escazú 3, Ujarrás 2, Térraba 1 and Nicoya 3.

Other candidates were; Juan José Lara, Manuel Aguilar, Joaquín Iglesias, Manuel Fernández and Agustín Gutiérrez. In total, Carrillo obtained eleven electoral votes, mostly from San José, Lara received 11, Aguilar received 6, Iglesias 3 and the rest 1 each.

References

Elections in Costa Rica
1835 elections in Central America
1835 in Costa Rica